Nigel John Williams (born 29 July 1954) is an English former professional footballer who played as a right-back or midfielder. He played for Wolverhampton Wanderers and Gillingham between 1974 and 1979.

References

1954 births
Living people
Sportspeople from Canterbury
Footballers from Kent
English footballers
Association football fullbacks
Association football midfielders
Gillingham F.C. players
Wolverhampton Wanderers F.C. players